Gilgamesh (1972–1975, 1977–1978) were a British jazz fusion band in the 1970s led by keyboardist Alan Gowen, part of the Canterbury scene.

History
The original basis of Gilgamesh was keyboardist Alan Gowen and drummer Mike Travis, the two working together on a band project with guitarist Rick Morcombe. The original Gilgamesh line-up consisted of Gowen, Travis, Morcombe, Jeff Clyne and Alan Wakeman on saxophone.

The band's line-up took a while to stabilise with, for example, Richard Sinclair deputising for Clyne on their debut performance in January 1973; soon afterwards it settled on the quartet of Gowen, Travis, Phil Lee on guitar (recommended by Travis) and Neil Murray on bass. Regular gigs followed throughout 1973, including two special performances co-headlining with Hatfield and the North which included a "double-quartet" set consisting of a 40-minute composition by Gowen. A demo tape was also recorded for gig- and contract-hunting purposes.

In late 1973, Murray was replaced by Steve Cook but gigs subsequently became ever sparser, despite a series of radio sessions for the BBC's jazz programmes. For one of those the quartet were augmented with a second keyboard player, Peter Lemer. In 1975 Gilgamesh finally secured a contract with Virgin's subsidiary label Caroline Records, and recorded their debut album in downtime at the Virgin-owned Manor Studio, with Hatfield's Dave Stewart acting as co-producer.

Gowen and Stewart had become friends over the previous months and discussed a possible collaboration, but Stewart was hesitant about being in two bands simultaneously. When Hatfield and the North finally broke up in mid-1975, Stewart joined Gilgamesh as auxiliary member, playing one gig and a couple of radio sessions with the group. Meanwhile, plans were laid for the Stewart-Gowen collaboration, which eventually materialised as National Health and also (briefly) included Gilgamesh guitarist Phil Lee. Gilgamesh themselves ceased operations in late 1975 following the cancellation of a proposed Scottish tour.

After leaving National Health, in 1977 Gowen reformed Gilgamesh as a rehearsal-oriented unit with Murray, Lee and drummer Trevor Tomkins (a longtime collaborator of Lee's) for occasional rehearsals. A second album was recorded in June 1978, Another Fine Tune You've Got Me Into (released 1979 on Charly Records), with Gowen, Lee, Tomkins and bassist Hugh Hopper, but the band had no further existence. Gowen died a few years later in 1981.

In 2000 Cuneiform Records released archive recordings of the band under the name Arriving Twice. It consists of the 1973 demo as well as two radio sessions from 1974–75. It features variously Gowen, Lee, Travis, Murray, Cook, Clyne and Lemer, and includes several previously unheard compositions, notably "Extract", from the unrecorded Gilgamesh/Hatfield and the North double-quartet piece.

Discography

Filmography
 2015: Romantic Warriors III: Canterbury Tales (DVD)

References

External links
Gilgamesh FAQ at Calyx
 

Canterbury scene
Jazz fusion ensembles
Musical groups established in 1972
Musical groups disestablished in 1978
1972 establishments in the United Kingdom
1978 disestablishments in the United Kingdom